The Arlington County Fire Department (ACFD) provides fire, emergency medical, and allied public safety services for Arlington County and the City of Falls Church in Virginia, USA. It is highly regarded within the profession as an innovator and leader in enhancing the industry. Among its many firsts are the hiring of the first female career firefighter in the world in 1974 and partnering with the United States Public Health Service to develop America's first Metropolitan Medical Strike Team to respond to the consequences of a chemical, biological or radiological terrorist attack.

The ACFD operates nine stations and is a signatory to an automatic regional response plan with neighboring Fairfax County as well as the city of Alexandria, and participates in a regional mutual aid pact with the District of Columbia and the Maryland counties of Montgomery and Prince George’s. Ronald Reagan Washington National Airport, also in Arlington County, fields a fire department as part of the Metropolitan Washington Airports Authority Fire and Rescue Department and works closely with the county's fire service. The 300-plus employees of the Fire Department provide services through a combination of education, prevention and effective response to fire, medical and environmental emergencies.

The Arlington County Fire Department holds a Class 2 Rating from the Insurance Services Organization, the second-highest rating given to a Virginia fire department, and one of only three such ratings awarded in the state. This rating helps the local community by bringing lower insurance rates to homeowners and businesses.

Staffing

Arlington County Fire Department is a career fire department, with over 380 sworn career firefighters. All units are staffed 24 hours a day by career firefighter/EMTs who are divided into three platoons. Engine Companies, Rescue Companies and Truck Companies/Tower companies in Arlington are typically staffed by three firefighter/EMTs and one firefighter/paramedic, and ALS transport units are staffed with one firefighter/EMT and one firefighter/paramedic. Arlington operates nine engine companies, three truck companies, two rescue companies and eight medic units. Additional medic units can be placed in service as necessary. The county is divided into two divisions, the North Division (112) and the South Division (111), both of which are staffed with one Battalion Chief, an Advanced Paramedic Officer, an Assistant Fire Marshal and Deputy Fire Marshals.

Standard Units and Station Assignments 

Notes:

 Fire Station 7 was permanently closed, effective Oct 9th, 2019
 The Bravo "B" identifier is used whenever there are two of the same unit operating out of the station. For instance if both "Medic 104" and "Medic 104 Bravo" are in service
 The Echo "E" identifier is used whenever volunteers have placed an ambulance in service. For instance, "Ambulance 106 Echo".
 The Medic "M" suffix on a suppression unit indicates it has ALS staffing
 Rescue 101 on order

Other Fire Departments in the Arlington County System
Arlington County Fire Department is the primary all-hazards response agency for Arlington County, Virginia.  In addition to ACFD, other fire departments operate and provide emergency and support services to Arlington County.

Prior to 1950, independent volunteer fire companies protected Arlington County. As the demand for services for fire and EMS grew, the need for full-time paid staff was acknowledged by the County. Staff was hired, first to augment the volunteers, then finally to provide the full range of services required in a modern, urban, fire department. The volunteer members ride as supplemental staffing on apparatus and do not count as minimum staffing. The Arlington County Fire Department uses the volunteer apparatus for staffing during peak call volume times and for providing support services, such as special event stand-bys, storm and natural disaster staffing, and scene lighting, air replenishment and canteen services for long duration incidents.

Bomb Squad

The Arlington County bomb squad is jointly operated by the ACFD and the Arlington County Police Department. While the bomb disposal rigs are staffed by the fire department, and stored at Fire Station 3, the Bomb Squad works with the ACPD explosive canine teams on explosive related incidents. The squad is classified as a Type 2 squad on FEMA's three-level classification system.
This classification denotes that the bomb squad has the following equipment available:
 2 or more response teams
 Full coverage bomb suits
 Portable x-ray devices
 Employ explosive tools to conduct specific or general disruption
 Demolition Kit
 PPE for chemical and biological devices
 A Bomb disposal robot capable of handling non-vehicle IEDs
 Explosives reference library

September 11 and the Pentagon

The Arlington County Fire Department was the lead agency in the response to the Pentagon attack. ACFD Assistant Chief James Schwartz implemented an incident command system (ICS) to coordinate response efforts among multiple agencies. It took about an hour for the ICS structure to become fully operational. Firefighters from Fort Myer and Reagan National Airport arrived within minutes.

As a result of the attack on the Pentagon, additional career firefighters were hired, bringing the total to 305 by 2005. Minimum staffing on the county's engine companies was also increased to four firefighters from three in the months after the attack. The county trained CERT Teams - Community Emergency Response Teams - in cooperation with the federal Department of Homeland Security as a part of its stepped up disaster preparedness program.

Gallery

See also

Arlington County, Virginia
American Airlines Flight 77
911th Engineer Company - Formerly the Military District of Washington Engineer Company, specializes in urban search and rescue and responded to the Pentagon following the attack on the Pentagon.
Judith Livers Brewer, first female career firefighter in the United States

External links
 Arlington County Fire Department
 Arlington County Fire and Rescue Association (Volunteer Organizations)

References

Arlington County, Virginia
Fire departments in Virginia
1950 establishments in Virginia
Government agencies established in 1950